Leaving My Empire is the fourth studio album from Irish alternative band Fred. The album was recorded in Montreal, Quebec, Canada by Howard Bilerman (who also worked with Arcade Fire). Additional recording for the album was done at Lovetap Studios in the band's native Cork. Mixing was done by Ben Hillier and the album was mastered by Andy Vandette at Masterdisk, New York. Additional recording instrumentation on the album was provided by Larissa O'Grady (strings) and Eamon Nolan (trumpet).

Reception 
Leaving My Empire received favourable reviews from several Irish music blogs and websites. State.ie called it "a record that will appeal as much to your whistling dairy deliverer as your cooler than cool younger brother.", while Swearimnotpaul.com said "This album is a lot of things, but mostly it’s fun."

Track listing

References

2011 albums
Fred (band) albums
Albums produced by Howard Bilerman